Adinassa is a small genus of African sea snails in the family Nassariidae (unassigned in a subfamily). The type species was originally named Adinopsis skoogi in 1923, though the genus name Adinopsis had already been used for a genus of beetles five years earlier. Nearly 100 years later, the genus was renamed Adinassa and two new species were described.

Species
There are three species within the genus Adinassa:
 Adinassa barcai 
 Adinassa parrulai 
 Adinassa skoogi

References